Private banking is banking, investment and other financial services provided by banks and financial institutions primarily serving high-net-worth individuals (HNWIs)—defined as those with very high levels of income or sizable assets. A bank that specializes in private banking is called a private bank. Private banking is a more exclusive  subset of wealth management, geared toward exceptionally affluent clients. The term "private" refers to customer service rendered on a more personal basis than in mass-market retail banking, usually provided via dedicated bank advisers. At least until recently, it largely consisted of banking services (deposit taking and payments), discretionary asset management, brokerage, limited tax advisory services and some basic concierge-type services, offered by a single designated relationship manager.

History 
Private banking is how banking originated. The first banks in Venice were focused on managing personal finance for wealthy families. Private banks came to be known as "private" to stand out from the retail banking and savings banks aimed at the new middle class. Traditionally, private banks were linked to families for several generations. They often advised and performed all financial and banking services for these families. Historically, private banking has developed in Europe (see the List of private banks). Some banks in Europe are known for managing the assets of some royal families. The assets of the Princely Family of Liechtenstein are managed by LGT Group (founded in 1920 and originally known as The Liechtenstein Global Trust). The assets of the Dutch royal family are managed by MeesPierson (founded in 1720). The assets of the British Royal Family are managed by Coutts (founded in 1692).

Historically, private banking has been viewed as a very exclusive niche that only caters to HNWIs—specifically those with liquidity over $2 million, though it is now possible to open private banking accounts with as little as $250,000 for private investors. An institution's private banking division provides services such as wealth management, savings, inheritance, and tax planning for their clients. For private banking services, clients pay either based on the number of transactions, the annual portfolio performance or a "flat-fee", usually calculated as a yearly percentage of the total investment amount.

"Private" also alludes to bank secrecy and minimizing taxes through careful allocation of assets, or by hiding assets from the taxing authorities. Swiss and certain offshore banks have been criticized for such cooperation with individuals practicing tax evasion. Although tax fraud is a criminal offense in Switzerland, tax evasion is only a civil offence, not requiring banks to notify taxing authorities.

In Switzerland, there are many banks providing private banking services. Switzerland has remained neutral since the Congress of Vienna in 1815, including through two World Wars. After World War I, the former nobles of Austro-Hungarian Empire moved their assets to Switzerland for fear of confiscation by new governments. During World War II, many wealthy people, including Jewish families and institutions, moved their assets into Switzerland to protect them from Nazi Germany. However, this transfer of wealth into Switzerland had mixed and controversial results, as beneficiaries had difficulties retrieving their assets after the war. After World War II, in eastern Europe, assets were again moved into Switzerland for fear of confiscation by communist governments. 

Today, Switzerland remains the largest offshore center, with about 27 percent ($2.0 trillion) of global offshore wealth in 2009, according to Boston Consulting Group. Offshore wealth is defined as assets booked in a country where the investor has no legal residence or tax domicile.

In England, private banks were established in the 17th century, in parallel with the development of agriculture, managing the assets of the royal family, nobility and the landed gentry.

The United States has one of the largest private banking systems in the world, in part due to the 3.1 million HNWIs accounting for 28.6% of the global HNWIs population in 2010, according to the co-research of Capgemini and Merrill Lynch. Some American banks that specialize in private banking date back to the 19th century, such as U.S. Trust (founded in 1853) and Northern Trust (founded in 1889).

Recent developments in private banking
The internationalization of the economy, technological developments such as the Internet and mobile phones ensure that banks have to innovate their value proposition and look for new markets. For example, the growth of HNWIs is low in traditional private banking markets like Europe, compared to Asia where the number of millionaires has grown to 3.6 million. 

Banks also provide a sampling of the private banking services at a lower price point than traditional private banking. These are called premium banking or priority banking services. They are meant for mass-affluent customers. The accounts do not generate as much revenue as traditional private  banking, but given the number of customers, they amount to a sizeable revenue to the bank. The products offered to premium banking customers are the same as that for private banking customers with the exception that they do not include hedge funds or facilities to manage one's own business accounts. In short, it is wealth management at a much smaller scale.

In 2016, Credit Suisse and UBS replaced the word "private banking" with wealth management; private banking has faced reputational risk as an area for tax avoidance or even tax aversion.

Wealth minimums 
Private banking services are only accessible to customers with a minimum amount of investible assets. For instance, in 2016, J.P. Morgan began requiring a minimum of $10 million in assets to qualify for their private banking, with those with less being moved into their Private Client Direct program. Nevertheless, this seems to be an exception as majority of banks establish the minimum threshold between $0.5M and $1M.

Indeed, private banking customers are frequently segmented according to their wealth. HNW are customers with a total worth between €500,000 and €5 million; very high net worth individuals (VHNWI), with assets ranging between €5 million and €30 million; and ultra high networth individuals (UHNWI), with a wealth in excess of €30 million.

Private banking rankings

By AUM
In terms of AUM, the world's 10 largest private banks (or private banking divisions/subsidiaries of large bank holding companies), as of 2019, are:

Overall

Results from Euromoney's annual private banking and wealth management ranking in 2019, which consider, amongst other factors, assets under management (AUM), net income and net new assets. UBS Global Wealth Management took the top spot in Euromoney's 2019 survey for "Best private banking services overall 2019".

This table displays results of one category of the private banking ranking, "Best global private banking services overall 2019".

Value proposition 
Most private banks define their value proposition along one or two dimensions, and meet the basic needs across others. Some of the dimensions of value proposition of a private bank are parent brand, one-bank approach, unbiased advice, strong research and advisory team and unified platform.

Many banks leverage the "parent brand" to gain a client’s trust and confidence. These banks have a strong presence across the globe and present private bank offerings as a part of the parent group. "One Bank approach" is where private banks offer an integrated proposition to meet clients personal and business needs. Since private banking concerns understanding a client’s need and risk appetite, and tailoring the solution accordingly, few banks define their value proposition along this dimension. Most modern private banks follow an open product platform, and hence claim their advice is unbiased. They believe there is no incentive to push proprietary products, and the client gets the best of what they offer. A few banks claim to have a "strong advisory team" that reflects in the products they offer the client. A couple of banks also define their value proposition on their unified platform, their ability to comply with all regulations, yet serve the client without restrictions.

Product platform 
Open architecture product platform is where a private bank distributes all the third party products and is not restricted to selling only its proprietary products. Closed architecture product platform is where the bank sells only its proprietary products and does not entertain any third party product. These days the needs of the clients are so diverse that it is practically impossible for a bank to cater to those needs by its proprietary products alone. Clients today demand the best of breed products and most banks have to follow an open architecture product platform where they distribute products of other banks to their clients in return for commission. Products offered to private banking clients include equities, fixed-income securities, structured products, foreign exchange, commodities, deposits and real-estate investments.

Fee structure 
Different banks charge their clients in different ways. There are banks that follow the transactional model where the client is not charged any advisory fee at all. The banks thrive totally on the commissions they get by distributing third party products. There are other private banks that follow a hybrid model. In this model, the bank charges a fixed fee for certain products and advisory fee for the rest. Some of the other banks are totally advisory driven  and charge the clients a percentage of AUM (e.g. 0.75% of entire AUM).
A few banks offer both a transactional model and an advisory model. The clients choose what suits them. A recent industry trend is towards the advisory fee model, because margins on commissions may go down in the future.

Lead generation 

Lead generation is a vital part of the private banking business. Various banks go about in different ways to acquire new clients. While some banks rely heavily on their wholesale banking referrals there are a few others that have strong tie-ups with their retail and corporate banking divisions. Most banks do have a revenue sharing mechanism in place within divisions. It is either a onetime charge to the division or an annuity that the division gets for a client referral. Many banks believe that the primary source of leads must be client referrals. A client would refer his/her friends when he/she is satisfied with the service provided by the private bank. Generating a good number of leads through client referrals shows the good health of the private bank.

See also

Public bank
Family office
Multi-family office

References

External links 
About Swiss Financial Centre by Swissworld.org
 Businessweek: In the Battle of the Big Brokers, Merrill Is Winning

 
Banking
Distribution of wealth